Jared Michael "Skip" Schumaker (born February 3, 1980) is an American professional baseball player, coach and manager, who is the manager of the Miami Marlins of Major League Baseball (MLB). He was an outfielder and second baseman for the St. Louis Cardinals, Los Angeles Dodgers, and Cincinnati Reds. He previously served as a bench coach for the Cardinals and San Diego Padres.

High school and college
Schumaker graduated from Aliso Niguel High School in Aliso Viejo, California. He enrolled at the University of California, Santa Barbara to play college baseball for the UC Santa Barbara Gauchos. In 2001, his only year with regular playing time, Schumaker had 100 total hits for a batting average of an even .400, while recording 41 runs batted in (RBIs).

Professional career

Minor leagues
The St. Louis Cardinals selected Schumaker in the fifth round of the 2001 Major League Baseball draft.

Schumaker spent the remainder of 2001 with the short-season New Jersey Cardinals, and in  he had 158 hits for the Potomac Cannons.

St. Louis Cardinals
After spending the first two months of the season in Memphis, Schumaker made his major-league debut on June 8 against the Boston Red Sox at Busch Stadium. Schumaker entered the game as a pinch-hitter for the pitcher, Chris Carpenter, and was struck out by David Wells. Schumaker remained with the club until June 14, failing to pick up a hit in five at-bats.

On August 10, he was called back up to the Cardinals and picked up his first major-league hit two days later in a pinch-hit appearance against the Chicago Cubs. On September 8, 2005, Schumaker went over into the stands and made a great catch. In 27 Major League games of 2005, Schumaker batted .250 with an RBI.

Schumaker hit his first Major League home run on April 5, 2006, in a game against the Philadelphia Phillies. He played in 28 regular-season games in 2006 for St. Louis, but did not appear in the postseason. He would still receive his first career championship ring as the Cardinals bested the Detroit Tigers in five games of the 2006 World Series.
 
Schumaker became a capable leadoff hitter and a strong defensive outfielder with an above-average arm. However, he has difficulty against left-handers; from 2007 to 2009, he had a .210 batting average, a .278 on-base percentage, and a .226 slugging percentage against them. He had six hits in seven at-bats against the New York Mets on July 26, the first Cardinal to do so since Terry Moore against the Boston Braves on September 5, 1935. Combined, Schumaker and his teammate, Albert Pujols, were the first pair of Cardinals to hit five or more hits each since Charlie Gelbert and Taylor Douthit against the Chicago Cubs on May 16, 1930.

On February 9, 2009, Cardinal second baseman Adam Kennedy was released by the club, which sparked discussion about placing Schumaker as the regular second baseman in 2009. Schumaker, who played shortstop in high school and college began working out with Cardinals third base coach Jose Oquendo in spring training to prepare. Schumaker would go on to become the Cardinals' starting second baseman during the 2009 season.

On February 8, 2010, Schumaker signed a two-year deal with the Cardinals worth $4.7 million, buying out his final arbitration years. On August 9, 2010, Schumaker hit his first major league grand slam against the Cincinnati Reds. On August 23, 2011, he made his major league pitching debut when he came in as a reliever in the top of the 9th. He faced five batters, striking out two, walking one, and giving up a two-run home run to Aaron Miles.

After the 2011 National League Division Series against the Philadelphia Phillies, in which he drove in Rafael Furcal for the only run in the Cardinals' 1–0 victory in Game 5, Schumaker was left off the National League Championship Series roster due to an oblique injury. He was added back to the 25-man roster for the 2011 World Series against the Texas Rangers and won his second championship title after the Cardinals won the series after a deciding seven games.

Schumaker signed another two-year deal with the Cardinals on December 12, 2011, for $3 million.

Los Angeles Dodgers

On December 12, 2012, the St. Louis Cardinals traded Schumaker to the Los Angeles Dodgers for minor league shortstop Jake Lemmerman. He played in 125 games for the Dodgers, hitting .263. He also pitched two scoreless innings for the Dodgers during the season.

Cincinnati Reds
On November 18, 2013, Schumaker signed a 2-year, $5 million contract with the Cincinnati Reds with a club option for 2016. He attributed his choice to their playoff contention in recent years. The deal was finalized on November 26.

San Diego Padres
In February 2016, Schumaker signed a minor league contract with the Padres that included an invitation to Major League spring training. On March 9, Schumaker announced his retirement.

Post-playing career

San Diego Padres
On December 4, 2017, Schumaker agreed to become the new first base coach for the San Diego Padres. He was promoted to associate manager prior to the 2020 season.

St. Louis Cardinals
On November 6, 2021, Schumaker was hired as the bench coach for the St. Louis Cardinals.

Miami Marlins
The Miami Marlins hired Schumaker as their manager on October 25, 2022 after the 2022 season, replacing Don Mattingly.

Personal life
Schumaker is a Christian. Schumaker and his wife, Lindsey, have two children, a son and a daughter. They previously resided in Ladera Ranch, California, but sold the home in 2017. They still live in Orange County, California.

When Schumaker was five years old and living in southern California, he had a chance encounter with Tommy Lasorda and Orel Hershiser at a restaurant, both of whom signed his baseball glove with "To a future Dodger...". When he reached the Major Leagues with the Cardinals, Schumaker was given uniform number 55, which "happened to be Orel's number and I stuck with it." When he joined the Dodgers in 2013, he initially wore #3, but switched to #55 when it became available.

References

External links

1980 births
Living people
Aliso Niguel High School alumni
Baseball coaches from California
Baseball players from Torrance, California
Cincinnati Reds players
Grand Canyon Rafters players
Los Angeles Dodgers players
Louisville Bats players
Major League Baseball first base coaches
Major League Baseball outfielders
Memphis Redbirds players
New Jersey Cardinals players
Potomac Cannons players
St. Louis Cardinals players
St. Louis Cardinals coaches
San Diego Padres coaches
Tennessee Smokies players
UC Santa Barbara Gauchos baseball players